WKKW is a country formatted broadcast radio station licensed to Fairmont, West Virginia, serving North Central West Virginia. WKKW is owned and operated by West Virginia Radio Corporation.

References

External links
 97.9 WKKW Online
 

1975 establishments in West Virginia
KKW
Radio stations established in 1975
KKW